Alan IV (c. 1063 – 13 October 1119) was Duke of Brittany from 1072 until his abdication in 1112. He was also Count of Nantes (from c. 1103) and Count of Rennes. His parents were Duchess Hawise and Duke Hoel II. He is also known as Alan Fergant. Through his father, he was of the Breton House of Cornouaille dynasty (Breton: Kerne dynasty). He was the last Breton-speaking Duke of Brittany.

Conflict with Normandy

A traditional rivalry between Brittany and Normandy continued at the close of the 11th century. The Breton-Norman war of 1064–1065 was the result of William the Bastard, Duke of Normandy (later to become known as William the Conqueror) support of rebels in Brittany against Alan's maternal uncle, Conan II.

Conan II died in late 1066 during a campaign in Anjou, and was succeeded by Alan's parents, Conan's sister, Hawise, and her husband, Hoel II. Alan became Duke in 1072, but being a minor, Hoel ruled as regent from Hawise's death in 1072 until Alan reached his majority in 1084.

To prevent further hostilities during his invasion of England, William I married his daughter Constance to the new duke Alan in 1087. The marriage ceremonies may have taken place in Bayeux in Normandy. William of Malmesbury wrote that Constance was unpopular at the Breton court because of her "severe and conservative" manner. However, Orderic Vitalis wrote that as duchess Constance did all she could to further the welfare of the Bretons, who grieved deeply at her death in 1090.

In 1092, Alan IV donated property to the abbey of Redon by charter, and by 1093 married Ermengarde of Anjou, as a political alliance with Fulk IV of Anjou to counter Anglo-Norman influence.  

Duke Alan IV's cousin Geoffrey I Boterel (eldest brother of Alan Rufus) died on 24 August 1093 in battle at Dol while in rebellion against the Duke.

Between 1101 and 1104, Alan's younger brother, Count Matthew II of Nantes, died without issue and his county passed to Alan.

Alan IV abdicated as duke in 1112. The former duke retired to the monastery of Redon, where he died in 1119.

Crusader
In 1098 Alan went on the First Crusade, as part of the army of Robert Curthose, leaving Ermengarde as his regent, and returned in 1101.

Family

Alan IV married Constance in 1087. Constance died in 1090. William of Malmesbury alleges that her husband, Alan, had their servants poison her.
They had no children.

Alan's second marriage was to Ermengarde of Anjou in 1093. With Ermengarde he had three children:
Geoffrey - died young;
 Conan - his successor as Duke of Brittany
 Hawise - she married Count Baldwin VII of Flanders, also known as Hawise Fergant. They divorced and had no issue.

Alan and Ermengarde were separated upon his abdication as duke in 1112.

He had two illegitimate sons:
Brian Fitzcount - held the lordships of Wallingford and Abergavenny. Was a favourite of Henry I of England, and a staunch supporter of his daughter, the Empress Matilda, during the Anarchy (1135–1153).
 Guihomar

Succession
Alan IV died in 1119 at the monastery of Redon, where he had retired after his abdication in 1112, and separation from his wife Ermengarde. His only surviving son, Conan III succeeded him.

See also
Dukes of Brittany family tree

Notes

References

Sources

External links

http://patp.us/genealogy/conq/richmond.aspx

1060s births
1119 deaths
11th-century dukes of Brittany
12th-century dukes of Brittany
Dukes of Brittany
Christians of the First Crusade
Year of birth uncertain